Train Warning System may refer to:

 Train Warning System (India)
 Train Warning System (US)